Manulife Place is a highrise office building and shopping mall in Edmonton, Alberta, Canada. It was completed in 1983 and designed by Clifford Lawrie Bolton Ritchie Architects. It is located at the corner of 102 Avenue and 101 Street in downtown Edmonton. Naming rights of the complex are held by insurer Manulife.

The building has a two level shopping concourse. Manulife Place is connected by the Edmonton Pedway to Edmonton City Centre and Commerce Place.

History of the site
The location of Manulife Place was formerly the home of the King Edward Hotel which stood on the site from 1904 to 1980, before being destroyed by fire.

Manulife Place was constructed by the local general contractor PCL Construction, with another local contractor, C. W. Carry manufacturing and erecting the structural steel.

Luxury department chain Holt Renfrew had a 30,000 square foot store at Manulife Place from 1982 until January 11, 2020, as the Louis Vuitton concession inside the store had departed for West Edmonton Mall, and as the Holt Renfrew chain decided to focus on larger stores with 130,000 square feet or more.

See also
List of tallest buildings in Edmonton
List of Edmonton malls

References

External links

Buildings and structures completed in 1983
Buildings and structures in Edmonton
Skyscraper office buildings in Canada
Shopping malls in Edmonton
Skyscrapers in Edmonton
Tourist attractions in Edmonton
1983 establishments in Alberta